UN is an abbreviation for the United Nations, an intergovernmental organization with 193 member states.

UN or Un may also refer to:

Music
 UN (band), a Korean musical group
 U.N. (group), a hip hop group
 UN (album), an album by Dan Black
 Un (album), by the anarchist band Chumbawamba

Places 
 Un, a village in Lum Choar, Cambodia
 Un, Surat, a town in Gujarat, India
 Un, Uttar Pradesh, a town in India

Other uses 
 Lance Rivera, known as Lance "Un" Rivera, American film producer
 Transaero (IATA code:UN)
 National Exam (Indonesia) (Ujian Nasional)
 Uranium mononitride, part of the uranium nitride family of compounds

See also
 UN number, a four-digit number that identifies a hazardous substance

 Union Nationale (disambiguation), any one of several political parties
 United Nations (disambiguation)
 Unn (disambiguation)